Steven Guy Paul Hewitt (born 6 April 1963) is an English former first-class cricketer.

Hewitt was born at Radcliffe in April 1963 and later studied at Peterhouse, Cambridge. While studying at Cambridge, he played first-class cricket for Cambridge University Cricket Club from 1983 and 1984, making nine appearances. Playing as a wicket-keeper in the Cambridge side, Hewitt scored 29 runs at an average of 4.83 and with a highest score of 26. Behind the stumps he took nine catches and made two stumpings. His elder brother is the Anglo-French cricketer Simon Hewitt, who also played at first-class level.

References

External links

1963 births
Living people
People from Radcliffe, Greater Manchester
Alumni of Peterhouse, Cambridge
English cricketers
Cambridge University cricketers